IDL-Reporteros is an online newspaper based in Lima, Peru, that specializes in investigative journalism against corruption in Peru and to promote transparency with the nation. Since its founding, the newspaper has initiated over 500 investigations throughout Peru.

History 
The newspaper was founded in October 2009 by veteran reporter Gustavo Gorriti, initially with only two reporters. One of the first main investigations occurred in February 2010, with the report involving the purchase of armoured personnel carrier by the Peruvian Armed Forces at a highly inflated price later being spread through national media outlets.

IDL-Reporteros assisted the International Consortium of Investigative Journalists with journalistic and research work involved in the 2021 Pandora Papers leak.

Recognition 
IDL-Reporteros is a member of the Global Investigative Journalism Network, has been supported by the Open Society Foundations and was recognized as an Ashoka Changemaker as part of the Ashoka Fellows project. Human rights organizations in Venezuela, including PROVEA and Transparency Venezuela, have expressed support and collaborated with the newspaper.

References 

Investigative journalism
News leaks
Newspapers published in Peru
Pandora Papers